The Euro-Mediterranean University in Fez is a university located in Fez, Morocco. The creation of the university was approved by the Union for the Mediterranean in 2012. It opened in 2014. 

The Institut National des Sciences Appliquées de Euro-Méditerranée (INSA Euro-Méditerranée) is a French engineering school partnership with UEMF in Morocco. INSA Euro-Méditerranée is a member of the Institut national des sciences appliquées (Groupe INSA), one of the largest science and engineer training networks in France.

References

External links
 

Universities in Morocco